The 1924 PGA Championship was the seventh PGA Championship, held September 15–20 at the French Lick Springs Golf Club in French Lick, Indiana. Walter Hagen, the 1921 champion, defeated Jim Barnes in the finals, 2 up. It was the sixth of Hagen's eleven major titles.

The victory ran Hagen's match record at the PGA Championship in the 1920s to 15–1, falling only to Gene Sarazen in 38 holes in the 1923 finals. It was the first of Hagen's four consecutive PGA Championships; through 2013, no other player was won more than two consecutive titles.
Barnes had won the first two titles in 1916 and 1919.

The field of 32 for match play was determined by the 36-hole stroke play qualifier on Monday, September 15. All matches were 36 holes, in a five-round single-elimination tournament.  Two-time defending champion Sarazen lost in the second round to semifinalist Larry Nabholtz, 2 & 1.

Opened in 1917, the course was designed by Donald Ross.

Format
The match play format at the PGA Championship in 1924 called for 12 rounds (216 holes) in six days:
 Monday - 36-hole stroke play qualifier
top 32 professionals advanced to match play
 Tuesday - first round - 36 holes 
 Wednesday - second round - 36 holes 
 Thursday - quarterfinals - 36 holes 
 Friday - semifinals - 36 holes 
 Saturday - final - 36 holes

Bracket 1

Bracket 2

Bracket 3

Bracket 4

Final four

References

External links
PGA Media Guide 2012
Results at golfobserver.com
PGA.com – 1924 PGA Championship
The Donald Ross Course at French Lick Resort

PGA Championship
Golf in Indiana
PGA Championship
PGA Championship
PGA Championship
PGA Championship